RPM was a Canadian magazine that published the best-performing singles of Canada from 1964 to 2000. A total of sixteen singles reached number one on the RPM Singles Chart in 1981. The year began with "(Just Like) Starting Over" by John Lennon at the top spot and ended with Olivia Newton-John's "Physical" at the summit. Eleven of the sixteen artists earned their first Canadian chart-topper this year; those who did so prior to 1981 were John Lennon, Blondie, Styx, The Moody Blues, and Olivia Newton-John. Lennon became the only artist this year to attain the number-one spot with more than one single, and no Canadians topped their home county's chart this year.

The best-performing single of the year in Canada was "Stars on 45 Medley" (also known as "Medley") by Dutch novelty act Stars on 45. Because no RPM issues were published between 11 July and 22 August, it remained at number one for 12 weeks, preventing the second-most-successful single of the year, "Bette Davis Eyes" by Kim Carnes, from taking the position. The song that spent the most published issues at number one, six, was "Endless Love" by Diana Ross and Lionel Richie, becoming Richie's first Canadian number-one hit and Ross's only chart-topper in Canada outside the Supremes. The singer who stayed at number one for the most weeks this year was John Lennon, whose singles "(Just Like) Starting Over" and "Woman" gave him seven weeks at the summit. The other acts that remained at number one for at least three weeks were Blondie, Kool & the Gang, and Juice Newton.

Chart history

Notes

See also
1981 in music

List of Billboard Hot 100 number ones of 1981 by Billboard
List of Cash Box Top 100 number-one singles of 1981 by Cashbox

References

External links
 Read about RPM Magazine at the AV Trust
 Search RPM charts here at Library and Archives Canada

RPM number-one singles
Canada Singles
1981